Dharma Devathai is a 1986 Indian Tamil-language action drama film directed by S. P. Muthuraman and produced by AVM Productions. The film stars Vijayakanth, Sarath Babu, Raadhika and Pallavi. It is a remake of the 1986 Telugu film Prathidhwani. The film was released on 1 November 1986, and Raadhika won the Filmfare Award for Best Actress – Tamil.

Plot 
Chandrasekhar, a strong-willed union leader in a factory, faces constant angry opposition to his campaign for workers' rights from Azhagusundaram; when Chandrasekhar ends up murdered, his brother Vijay and widow Jhansi seek revenge.

Cast 
Vijayakanth as Vijay
Sarath Babu as Chandrasekhar
Raadhika as Jhansi
Pallavi as Rekha
M. N. Nambiar as Kathiresan
Jai Ganesh as Azhagusundaram
Thengai Srinivasan as Chandrasekhar and Vijay's father
Y. G. Mahendran
Delhi Ganesh as Paramasivan
Disco Shanti

Soundtrack 
The music was composed by Raveendran, with lyrics by Vaali.

Release and reception 
Dharma Devathai was released on 1 November 1986.<ref>{{Cite web |last=பாண்டியராஜன் |first=மா. |date=19 September 2018 |title=விஜயகாந்த் முதல் பரத் வரை... ஒரே நாளில் 'டபுள் ரிலீஸ்' கொடுத்த ஹீரோக்கள்! |url=https://cinema.vikatan.com/tamil-cinema/137366-heroes-who-released-two-movies-on-the-same-day |url-access=subscription |url-status=live |archive-url=https://web.archive.org/web/20230104084630/https://cinema.vikatan.com/tamil-cinema/137366-heroes-who-released-two-movies-on-the-same-day |archive-date=4 January 2023 |access-date=4 January 2023 |website=Ananda Vikatan |language=ta}}</ref> The Indian Express wrote, "Dharma Devadhai, loud formula laden drama that it is, is quite safe, one supposes". Kalki'' said the film could be watched for the songs and action more than the story. For her performance, Raadhika won the Filmfare Award for Best Actress – Tamil.

References

External links 
 
 

1980s action drama films
1980s Tamil-language films
1986 films
Films directed by S. P. Muthuraman
Films scored by Raveendran
Indian action drama films
Tamil remakes of Telugu films